Blakeburn, also known as the Blakeburn Site, is an abandoned locality and former coal mine and coal mining town located southwest of the confluence of Granite Creek and the Tulameen River, across the latter from the surviving coal mining hamlet in the area, Coalmont, which was the railhead for the Blakeburn Mine Railway, connecting it to the Kettle Valley Railway.

Blakeburn was named c. 1923 for, and by, the President of Coalmont Collieries Ltd., William John "Blake" Wilson, with his employer in Vancouver, Patrick Burns of P. Burns & Co. meat packers and dealers, being Vice-President and the other major shareholder.

See also
List of ghost towns in British Columbia

References

Mining communities in British Columbia
Company towns in Canada
Ghost towns in British Columbia
Populated places in the Similkameen
Coal mines in Canada